Married and in Love is a 1940 American film directed by John Farrow.

Plot
A doctor, Leslie Yates, and a writer, Doris Wilding, once romantically involved, run into each other after a long time apart. Both are now married to other people.

Leslie invites her out to dinner, along with their spouses. Their affection for one another is rekindled. Helen, tipsy after dinner, lets Leslie know she can tell he's fondly remembering his former flame. Leslie's guilt gets the better of him, Helen having financed his way through medical school, but his heartstrings are pulling him in another direction.

Things come to a head when Paul walks in on his wife and Leslie sharing a kiss. Although they are hesitant to continue with plans for the four to again meet for dinner, they all do. During the course of events, everyone realizes he or she is wed to the right person after all.

Cast
 Alan Marshal as Leslie
 Patric Knowles as Paul
 Barbara Read as Helen Yates
 Helen Vinson as Doris

Production
The film was based on a play Distant Fields which had been presented in London in 1937. RKO bought the film rights in October 1937 intending to make it a vehicle for Barbara Stanwyck. Rowland V. Lee was assigned to direct. Jesse L. Lasky announced the film would be done in the style of 1933's The Power and the Glory and that Herbert Marshall, Joan Bennett and Joel McCrea would be sought to play support roles. However plans to make the film were thrown into disarray when Stanwyck refused to make the movie and was placed on suspension.

In June 1939 RKO announced they still intended to film the play. John Archer and Barbara Read were announced for the roles intended for Joel McCrea and Stanwyck. Eventually Archer was replaced by Patric Knowles.

Filming began 19 October 1939.

References

External links
Married and in Love at IMDb
Married and in Love at New York Times

1940 films
1940 romantic drama films
American romantic drama films
Films directed by John Farrow
1940s American films